Look Alive is the eighth studio album by American alternative rock band Guster, released on January 18, 2019. It is their first studio release since Evermotion in 2015, almost exactly four years earlier.

Track listing

Charts

References

External links
 Official website album page

2019 albums
Guster albums
Nettwerk Records albums
Albums produced by John Congleton